Hypostomus carvalhoi is a species of catfish in the family Loricariidae. It is native to South America, where it occurs in the Jaguaribe River basin. The species reaches 14.2 cm (5.6 inches) SL and is believed to be a facultative air-breather.

References 

Hypostominae
Fish described in 1937
Fish of South America